Bílovec is a town in Nový Jičín District in the Moravian-Silesian Region of the Czech Republic. It has about 7,300 inhabitants. The historic town centre is well preserved and is protected by law as an urban monument zone.

Administrative parts

Villages of Bravinné, Lhotka, Lubojaty, Ohrada, Stará Ves and Výškovice are administrative parts of Bílovec. Výškovice forms an exclave of the municipal territory.

Geography
Bílovec is situated mostly in the Nízký Jeseník mountain range. A small part of the territory extends into the Moravian Gate. Bílovec lies on the banks of the Bílovka River. Bílovec Reservoir is located on the outskirts of the town.

History

The first written mention of Bílovec is from 1324. The town was probably founded by Vok V of Kravaře between 1293–1324. It was located on the crossroads of two trade routes and belonged to Duchy of Troppau. Bílovec was heavily fortified with walls with two gates and a fortress.

In 1575–1576, the then-owner Bernard Pražma of Bílkov had rebuilt the fortress into a four-wing Renaissance castle. From 1652 until the 20th century, the estate was held by the Sedlnický of Choltice family. The town gained various privileges, which allowed it further development. After the large fire in 1729, the castle was baroque reconstructed.

In the second half of the 19th century, Bílovec was industrialized. A cloth factory(later a hat factory and then an iron factory), a steam saw, a book printer and a liqueur factory were established. In 1890, the railway was opened.

Until 1918, Bílovec was part of the Austro-Hungarian Empire (the Austrian side after the compromise of 1867), in the district with the same name, one of the eight Bezirkshauptmannschaften in Austrian Silesia.

In 1938, it was occupied by the Nazi Germany as part of the Reichsgau Sudetenland, the portion of Czechoslovakia turned over to Germany in wake of the Munich Agreement. After the conclusion of World War II, the German speaking population was expelled from the region in 1945 according to the Beneš decrees and replaced by Czech settlers.

After World War II, the construction of prefabricated houses took place, which disrupted the ancient character of the town.

Education
There is one secondary school in Bílovec, the Gymnasium of Nicolas Copernicus.

Sights

The town square is lined by preserved burgher houses. The landmarks of the square are the town hall and the Church of Saint Nicholas. The Renaissance town hall with gothic cellars dates from 1593. In a baroque burgher house from the 18th century there is the town museum.

The originally Gothic church was built in the 14th century. In 1771, baroque modifications of the church were made. The tower was built in 1614–1615.

In the middle of the square is a giant chessboard, with an area of  the largest one in the Czech Republic.

Bílovec Castle is open to the public. It containts several expositions and a gallery.

Notable people
Johann Ignaz Cimbal (1722–1795), Bohemian-Austrian painter
Felix Ivo Leicher (1727–1812), Bohemian-Austrian painter
Miloš Holaň (born 1971), ice hockey player and coach
Květa Peschke (born 1975), tennis player
Rostislav Olesz (born 1985), ice hockey player
Lukáš Hejda (born 1990), footballer
Petra Kvitová (born 1990), tennis player
Adam Pavlásek (born 1994), tennis player

Twin towns – sister cities

Bílovec is twinned with:
 Bad Neustadt an der Saale, Germany
 Kietrz, Poland
 Lipany, Slovakia

References

External links

Tourist Information Centre

Cities and towns in the Czech Republic
Populated places in Nový Jičín District